Ranks and insignia of NATO are combined military insignia used by the member countries of the North Atlantic Treaty Organization. 

The rank scale is used for specifying posts within NATO.

Ranks 
NATO maintains a "standard rank scale" in an attempt to match every member country's military rank to corresponding ranks used by the other members. The rank categories were established in a 1978 document entitled STANAG 2116 (formally titled NATO Codes for Grades of Military Personnel).

Officer ranks 
OF-1 – OF-10 (lowest rank to highest) are used for commissioned officers:
 OF-6 – OF-10: General officers
 OF-3 – OF-5: Senior officers
 OF-1 – OF-2: Junior officers

Other ranks 
OR1–OR9 (lowest rank to highest) are used for other ranks:
 OR-5 – OR-9: Non-commissioned officers
 OR-1 – OR-4: Enlisted ranks

Comparison to US system 
The numbers in the system broadly correspond to the U.S. uniformed services pay grades, with OR-x replacing E-x. The main difference is in the commissioned officer ranks, where the US system recognises two ranks at OF-1 level (O-1 and O-2), meaning that all O-x numbers after O-1 are one point higher on the US scale than they are on the NATO scale (e.g. a major is OF-3 on the NATO scale and O-4 on the US scale).

Ranks and insignia of member armed forces 
Army
 Ranks and insignia of NATO member army officers
 Ranks and insignia of NATO member army enlisted

Air Force
 Ranks and insignia of NATO member air force officers
 Ranks and insignia of NATO member air force enlisted

Navy
 Ranks and insignia of NATO member navy officers
 Ranks and insignia of NATO member navy enlisted

See also 
 Comparative military ranks

References

Citations

Sources

External links